Richard Haggie (8 October 1933 – 15 July 2005) was a New Zealand rugby league player who represented New Zealand.

Playing career
Haggie played at wing and fullback and represented Auckland.

In 1953 the touring American All Stars arrived in New Zealand. Short on players after a long tour of Australia, Haggie was one of the replacements called in to join the squad.

Haggie played for the New Zealand Māori in 1955, being part of the side that defeated the touring French squad 28-20. He was also part of the Auckland side that defeated France 17-15.

Haggie was then selected for the New Zealand national rugby league team 1955–56 tour of Great Britain and France. He played in one test against Great Britain and all three tests against France.

In 1958, Haggie was part of the Otahuhu Leopards side that played in the first ever Auckland Rugby League grand final, losing 7-16 to Ponsonby.

References

1933 births
2005 deaths
New Zealand rugby league players
New Zealand national rugby league team players
Auckland rugby league team players
Otahuhu Leopards players
United States national rugby league team players
New Zealand Māori rugby league team players
Rugby league fullbacks
Rugby league wingers